Newspapers made endorsements of candidates in the 1900 United States presidential election.  Incumbent President William McKinley was the Republican candidate, and William Jennings Bryan the Democratic candidate, a rematch of the 1896 election.

References 

1900 United States presidential election
United States presidential election endorsements
1900 in mass media
Newspaper endorsements
1900s politics-related lists